Olga Bancic (born Golda Bancic; also known under her French nom de guerre Pierrette; 10 May 1912 – 10 May 1944) was a Jewish Romanian communist activist, known for her role in the French Resistance. A member of the FTP-MOI and Missak Manouchian's Group, she was captured by Nazi German forces in late 1943, and executed soon after. Bancic was married to the writer and fellow FTP-MOI fighter Alexandru Jar.

Biography
Bancic was born to a Jewish family in Chișinău, Bessarabia, which was part of the Russian Empire at the time, becoming part of the Romanian Kingdom after World War I. She worked in a mattress factory by the age of 12, and joined the labor movement, taking part in a strike during which she was arrested and allegedly beaten. Bancic, who became a member of the outlawed Romanian Communist Party (PCR), was subsequently arrested several times. In 1936, she traveled to France, where she aided local left-wing activists in transporting weapons to Spanish Republican forces fighting in the Civil War.

Shortly before the outbreak of World War II, Bancic gave birth to Dolores, her daughter with Alexandru Jar, named after Dolores Ibárruri ("la Pasionaria"). She left Dolores in the care of a French family following the start of the German occupation, and joined the Paris-based Francs-tireurs et partisans – main-d'œuvre immigrée (FTP-MOI), taking part in about 100 sabotage acts against the Wehrmacht (Armed forces of Nazi Germany), and being personally involved in the manufacture and transport of explosives. This came at a time when the PCR, weakened by successive crackdowns, had become divided into several autonomous groups. Similar to Gheorghe Gaston Marin, Bancic was among the Romanian activists who were integrated into the French Communist Party.

Arrested by the Gestapo on 6 November 1943, she was subject to torture, but refused to give information about her comrades. After the arrest of the Manouchian Group, the Gestapo published a series of propaganda posters, named l'Affiche Rouge, which depicted its members, Bancic included, as "terrorists".

On 21 February 1944, she, Manouchian, and 21 others were sentenced to death—all male defendants were executed later that day at Fort Mont-Valérien; since a law prevented women from being executed on French soil, Bancic, the only female in the Group, was deported to Stuttgart and decapitated in the local prison's courtyard at 6 AM on  her 32nd birthday and was buried the same day. During her transportation to the place of execution, she composed a letter to her daughter Dolores, who was known under the name Dolores Jacob, on a piece of paper which she threw out a window.

Legacy

Bancic's widower, Alexandru Jar, returned to Romania at the end of the war, and established a career under the new Communist regime. During the 1950s, he became a noted opponent of the Party leadership around Gheorghe Gheorghiu-Dej, and, together with Mihail Davidoglu and Ion Vitner, faced criticism from activist Miron Constantinescu over his "intellectualist-liberalist tendencies".

Several streets were named in Bancic's honor, and small monuments were erected in her memory, along with a wall plaque in the PCF plot at Ivry Cemetery in Ivry-sur-Seine. Her name continued to be used as an asset by Communist authorities, but it fell into disuse after the 1989 Revolution. In 2005, writer and journalist Bedros Horasangian objected to the initiatives of Bucharest officials to remove the Polonă Street commemorative plaque making mention of her activities and to rename a street previously bearing her name, arguing that: "It is not proper and insults the memory of a woman  who actually died for Allied victory (when Romania was allied to the Germans!). [...] In France, those who have fought in the antifascist resistance enjoy full respect".

References

1912 births
1944 deaths
Politicians from Chișinău
People from Kishinyovsky Uyezd
Moldovan Jews
Romanian Communist Party politicians
Romanian emigrants to France
Romanian people of the Spanish Civil War
Women in the Spanish Civil War
Romanian participants in the French Resistance
FTP-MOI
Members of the Francs-tireurs et partisans
Romanian trade unionists
20th-century Romanian women politicians
Jewish socialists
Communist members of the French Resistance
Jews in the French resistance
Affiche Rouge
Female resistance members of World War II
Resistance members killed by Nazi Germany
People executed by Nazi Germany by guillotine
Romanian people executed abroad
Executed Romanian women
Romanian people executed by Nazi Germany
Jewish women
Executed communists
People executed by Nazi courts